The Daring Young Man on the Flying Trapeze and Other Stories is the first collection of 26 short stories by William Saroyan published in 1934 (Random House). The author was recognized as a "the most widely discussed discovery of 1934" and the book became an immediate bestseller.

The title story 
The title was inspired by the refrain of a popular folk song The Flying Trapeze:

He'd fly through the air with the greatest of ease,
That daring young man on the flying trapeze.

The story first appeared in the February issue of the Story magazine. It won the third prize of the O. Henry Award for the best short story of the year.

Contents 
 The Daring Young Man on the Flying Trapeze
 Seventy Thousand Assyrians
 Among the Lost
 Myself upon the Earth
 Love, Death, Sacrifice and So Forth
 1, 2, 3, 4, 5, 6, 7, 8
 And Man
 A Curved Line
 Snake
 Big Valley Vineyard
 Aspirin Is a Member of the N.R.A.
 Seventeen
 A Cold Day
 The Earth, Day, Night, Self
 Harry
 Laughter
 The Big Tree Coming
 Dear Greta Garbo
 The Man with the French Post Cards
 Three Stories
 Love
 War
 Sleep in Unheavenly peace
 Fight Your Own War
 Common Prayer
 The Shepherd's Daughter

References

External links 
 The Daring Young Man on the Flying Trapeze and Other Stories in the Open Library.
 De Oliveira, Willy Torresin. William Saroyan's Hero in The Daring Young Man on the Flying Trapeze. Curitiba: 1994. — 187 p.

1934 short story collections
American short story collections
Works by William Saroyan